22899 Alconrad, provisional designation , is a Koronian asteroid and binary system from the outer region of the asteroid belt, approximately 5 kilometers in diameter. It was discovered on 11 October 1999, by Croatian astronomers Korado Korlević and Mario Jurić at the Višnjan Observatory, Croatia.

When its minor-planet moon was discovered in 2003, it was the smallest known main-belt asteroid to possess a satellite. It was later named after American astronomer Albert R. Conrad.

Classification and orbit 

Alconrad belongs to the Koronis family, a collisional group of stony asteroids consisting of a few hundred known bodies with nearly ecliptical orbits. It orbits the Sun in the outer main-belt at a distance of 2.6–3.1 AU once every 4 years and 10 months (1,752 days). Its orbit has an eccentricity of 0.08 and an inclination of 3° with respect to the ecliptic. The body's observation arc begins 5 years prior to its official discovery observation, with a precovery taken by Steward Observatory's Spacewatch program in October 1994.

Physical characteristics

Rotation period 

In December 2009, a rotational lightcurve of Alconrad was obtained from photometric observations at the ground-based Wise Observatory in Mitzpe Ramon, Israel. Lightcurve analysis gave a rotation period of  hours with a brightness variation of  magnitude.

Diameter and albedo 

According to the survey carried out by the NEOWISE mission of NASA's Wide-field Infrared Survey Explorer, Alconrad measures 5.7 kilometers in diameter and its surface has an albedo of 0.18, while he Collaborative Asteroid Lightcurve Link assumes a standard albedo for members of the Koronis family of 0.24, and calculates a diameter of 4.9 kilometers with an absolute magnitude of 13.7.

Satellite 

In October 2003, when the asteroid moon  was discovered by the researchers at Southwest Research Institute using the Hubble Space Telescope, they calculated a diameter of 4.5 kilometers for the primary, based on an assumed albedo of 0.21. The researchers also measured a large angular separation of 0".14 between Alconrad and its moon. This is equivalent to a distance of 170 kilometers, or 182 kilometers, when using a/Rp ratio of 81. Based on a difference in magnitude of 2.5, the satellite measures 1 to 1.5 kilometers in diameter.

When the binary nature of Alconrad was discovered in 2003, it was the smallest binary asteroid known at the time. Since then, other binaries with a smaller primary have been discovered such as, for example, 4868 Knushevia (1.5 km) in 2015, and 8026 Johnmckay (1.7 km) in 2010.

Naming 

This minor planet was named in honor of American astronomer Albert R. Conrad (born 1953) who worked at various observatories in the United States. Expert in and developer of adaptive optics, he has studied the natural satellites of the Solar System for their shape and topography, and co-discovered many asteroid moons in the process. The official naming citation was published by the Minor Planet Center on 20 June 2016.

Notes

References

External links 
 Asteroids with Satellites, Robert Johnston, johnstonsarchive.net
 Asteroid Lightcurve Database (LCDB), query form (info )
 Dictionary of Minor Planet Names, Google books
 Asteroids and comets rotation curves, CdR – Observatoire de Genève, Raoul Behrend
 Discovery Circumstances: Numbered Minor Planets (20001)-(25000) – Minor Planet Center
 
 

022899
022899
Discoveries by Korado Korlević
Discoveries by Mario Jurić
Named minor planets
19991011